Daily Table is an American chain of low price grocery stores which sells food closer to its expiration date.

History 
Daily Table was founded in 2012 by Doug Rauch, the former president of Trader Joe's. The not-for-profit company aims to sell healthy food at a price point suitable for working poor families. It is designed to compete with fast food restaurants. Daily Table sells inexpensive produce and pre-packaged meals. Its prices are significantly lower than the lowest options at a traditional grocery store. The company is able to achieve these prices by sourcing foods close to their "sell-by" expiration dates. Distributors of these foods would prefer to donate or discount these products before discarding them. Daily Table considers itself the first not-for-profit supermarket of its kind.

Daily Table opened its first store in Dorchester, Massachusetts, on June 4, 2015.  It has since opened up stores in Roxbury, Massachusetts and Cambridge, Massachusetts.

The  is Dorchester store is set up like a boutique grocery with wood crates and a window to a food preparation area. The company has plans to expand to Detroit, Los Angeles, New York, and San Francisco.

References

Further reading

External links 

 

2015 establishments in Massachusetts
Supermarkets of the United States
Companies based in Massachusetts
Non-profit organizations based in Massachusetts
Retail companies established in 2015